Édson Boaro, best known as Édson and as Édson Abobrão (born July 3, 1959 at São José do Rio Pardo, São Paulo State) is a former Brazilian football (soccer) defender.

In his career, he played for Ponte Preta (1978–1984), Corinthians (1984–1989), Palmeiras (1989–1992), Guarani (1992), Noroeste, Paysandu and Remo (1993), Botafogo (1994–1995) and São José do Rio Pardo (1995–1998).

He won the Brazilian Silver Ball Award in 1984, one São Paulo State Championship in 1988 and one Pará State Championship in 1992. With the Brazil national football team he won at the Pan American Games in 1979, was capped 19 times between June 1983 and June 1986, and participated in the 1986 FIFA World Cup.

Édson played at right-back in Brazil’s opening two games in the 1986 World Cup in México, when first choice Leandro did not make the trip.  He was injured early in the second game, against Algeria in Guadalajara, and was replaced by the veteran midfielder Falcão.  However, Édson’s injury ultimately led to the début of Josimar, at right-back, for the next game against Northern Ireland. Édson, as luck would have it, never played for Brazil again. Since 1998, he is a coach.

References

 E-Pauta

1959 births
Living people
Brazilian footballers
1986 FIFA World Cup players
Campeonato Brasileiro Série A players
Brazil international footballers
Association football defenders
Brazilian football managers
Sport Club Corinthians Paulista players
Sociedade Esportiva Palmeiras players
Guarani FC players
Esporte Clube Noroeste players
Paysandu Sport Club players
Clube do Remo players
Botafogo de Futebol e Regatas players
Grêmio Esportivo Sãocarlense players
Esporte Clube Taubaté managers
Esporte Clube Noroeste managers
Associação Atlética Francana managers
São Bernardo Futebol Clube managers
Pan American Games gold medalists for Brazil
Pan American Games medalists in football
Footballers at the 1979 Pan American Games
Medalists at the 1979 Pan American Games
People from São José do Rio Pardo